East Ferry may refer to a number of places, including:
 East Ferry, a village and civil parish in Lincolnshire, England
 East Ferry, County Cork, a residential area on Cork Harbour, Ireland
 East Ferry, Nova Scotia, a community in Digby County, Canada
 East Ferry Avenue Historic District, a district in Detroit, Michigan